Otaman Bilyi (U132) was a  of the Ukrainian Navy and formerly the Soviet frigate (guard ship) SKR-112.

Service history
The ship was laid down at the Yantar shipbuilding yard (factory number 191) on April 26, 1967. It entered the service on May 30, 1968 and on September 21 moved from Baltiysk to Sevastopol under jurisdiction of the Black Sea Fleet.

From August 30, 1969 to January 31, 1970 the frigate carried out service in the Mediterranean Sea military zone providing help to the Armed Forces of Egypt (War of Attrition).

After the declaration of independence of Ukraine, it became the first warship that raised the Ukrainian flag and on July 21, 1992 made an unsanctioned move to Odessa. The initiator of the move was frigate captain Mykola Zhybarev.

Gallery

References

External links
 An excerpt from the memoirs of Admiral of the Fleet Vladimir Chernavina "Fleet in the fate of Russia", Moscow, "St. Andrew's Flag".
 Will Ukraine recognize the commander of SKR-112 Sherhiy Nastenko hero?
 And we go without changing course!..
 Ship SKR-112 - the legend of the Ukrainian Navy 
 SKR-112
 Anniversary of the Ukrainian "Potemkin"
 To the 15th anniversary of revival the Naval Forces of Ukraine
 About "SKR-112" no one cares. Svoboda № 147. August 2, 1996

1968 ships
Ships built at Yantar Shipyard
Petya-class frigates of the Ukrainian Navy
Cold War frigates of the Soviet Union